Hypolysia is a genus of small tropical air-breathing land snails, terrestrial pulmonate gastropod mollusks in the family Achatinidae.

Species
Species within the genus Hypolysia include:
It contains the following species:
 Hypolysia connollyana
 Hypolysia usambarica

References 

 Nomenclator Zoologicus info

 
Taxonomy articles created by Polbot